In digital signal processing, half-band filters are widely used for their efficiency in multi-rate applications. A half-band filter is a low-pass filter that reduces the maximum bandwidth of sampled data by a factor of 2 (one octave).  When multiple octaves of reduction are needed, a cascade of half-band filters is common.  And when the goal is downsampling, each half-band filter needs to compute only half as many output samples as input samples. 

It follows from the filter's definition that its transition region, or skirt, can be centered at frequency    where    is the input sample-rate.  That makes it possible to design a FIR filter whose every other coefficient is zero, and whose non-zero coefficients are symmetrical about the center of the impulse response.  (See )  Both of those properties can be used to improve efficiency of the implementation.

References

Further reading

https://www.dsprelated.com/showarticle/1113.php

Digital signal processing
Signal processing